The 2014 Moroccan census was held in Morocco between 1 September and 20 September 2014. The census was conducted by the High Planning Commission.

Modern techniques for statistics
This major national operation has mobilized the various technological, organizational and communication means available during the various stages of its implementation, and this census has been matched methodically, content and linearly with the standards adopted in this regard by the United Nations, which has given it a distinguished position compared to the rest of the previous national statistics in terms of its comprehensiveness to the population. Similar to the previous statistics, where modern techniques and methods are included, whether it comes to the stages of preparation or exploitation and dissemination of data, the same is true for the 2014 census, which has a special character due to its reliance on many developments, represented in particular in:
−The use of satellite images in cartographic works.
–A new approach to recruiting researchers and observers (submission of nominations via the Internet).
–Introducing new topics in the areas of demography, housing and disability.

References

External links
Population légale d'après les résultats du RGPH 2014 sur le Bulletin officiel N° 6354

Censuses in Morocco
2014 in Morocco
Morocco